Maria Luisa Castaneda (April 12, 1916 – February 12, 2015) was an American actress and the second wife of actor Marlon Brando. In films, she played exotic women and singers, such as in Flying Down to Rio (1933) and Mutiny on the Bounty (1935). She was the mother of Miko Castaneda Brando and Rebecca Brando Kotlizky.

Life and work

Movita, an American of Mexican descent, was born in Nogales, Arizona, on a train traveling between Mexico and Arizona. Movita began her acting career singing the Carioca to Ginger Rogers and Fred Astaire's first dance number in the first film in which the famous duo appeared together, Flying Down to Rio (1933). She continued playing exotic women in American and Spanish language films in the 1930s, most notably as a Tahitian girl, Tehanni in Mutiny on the Bounty (1935) alongside Clark Gable and Franchot Tone. She played an island girl in Paradise Isle (1937) and again in Girl from Rio (1939) with Warren Hull. She starred in the British thriller Tower of Terror (1941) alongside Wilfrid Lawson and Michael Rennie. After a break, she appeared as Henry Fonda's cook in Fort Apache (1948), then starred with Tim Holt in two further westerns: The Mysterious Desperado (1949) and Saddle Legion (1951).

In 1939, Movita married the Irish boxer, singer and actor Jack Doyle in Mexico. The marriage did not endure. After appearing in a few more minor westerns and a few television parts, she met the actor Marlon Brando in the late 1950s, after his breakup with Anna Kashfi. They married in 1960, and they had two children. Brando played the role of Fletcher Christian in the 1962 remake of the 1935 film in which Movita had played a Tahitian girl, Tehanni. Brando then married his co-star Tarita Teriipaia in 1962. Castaneda's marriage to Brando was annulled in 1968 after it was discovered her previous marriage to Doyle was still active. After a small role on television in 1977, Movita appeared as Ana in 17 episodes of Knots Landing from October 1987 to May 1989.

Death
Castaneda died on February 12, 2015, in Los Angeles, after being hospitalized for a neck injury two months before her 99th birthday.

Filmography

References

External links

 

1916 births
2015 deaths
20th-century American actresses
Actresses from Arizona
American film actresses
American television actresses
American actresses of Mexican descent
Hispanic and Latino American actresses
Brando family
People from Nogales, Arizona